Johan Brunström and Frederik Nielsen were the defending champions but chose not to defend their title.

Peter Polansky and Adil Shamasdin won the title after defeating Ruben Bemelmans and Joris De Loore 6–1, 6–3 in the final.

Seeds

Draw

References
 Main Draw
 Qualifying Draw

Knoxville Challenger - Doubles